Rod Williams (born January 15, 1973) is an offensive/defensive lineman who played for the Tampa Bay Storm of the Arena Football League from 1999 to 2007. He was named Second Team All-Arena in 2001.

External links
AFL stats

1973 births
Living people
People from Florida
American football offensive linemen
American football defensive linemen
Florida A&M Rattlers football players
Tampa Bay Storm players